Honanotherium is a genus of extinct giraffid from the late Miocene of Henan Province, China, and East Azerbaijan Province, northwestern Iran. It was closely related to Bohlinia and was once thought to be ancestral to the modern giraffe (genus Giraffa). The living animal would have resembled a modern giraffe, but was somewhat shorter, with more massive ossicones.

The first part of the generic name, honano refers to the Henan province of China, where the first specimens were recovered. The second part, therium, comes from the Greek, θηρίον which means "beast."

Paleobiology
 
Like the modern-day giraffe, Honanotherium may have grazed on low-lying trees in the savannah environment, although its shorter neck shows that it probably fed on different plants than the extant giraffe.

References 

Prehistoric giraffes
Miocene mammals of Asia
Miocene even-toed ungulates
Prehistoric even-toed ungulate genera
Fossil taxa described in 1927